Down Where the South Begins is an a cappella album by the Richmond chapter of SPEBSQSA, a barbershop men's singing group called the Tobaccoland Chorus.

Liner notes
The record jacket quotes a local columnist who wrote: The highly charged sound of our Tobaccoland Chorus comes from a combination of several important ingredients, one of which is the right blend of voices. Add to this some good musical arrangements and lots of rehearsals; mix the batch with top-notch direction and you have a winning sound.

The Richmond chapter was chartered in the early 1950s and spent many years trying to find that certain sound. The chorus was moving toward it as Bryan Whitehead took over as director in 1963. It wasn't long before the group was making championship music, aswas attested to by its contest winnings during the next several years. Much of the success of the chorus is due to Brian's dynamic personality, his knowledge of "barbershop," his conception of what the chorus should sound like and his ability to bring out exactly that sound.

The back also includes photos from "a video-taping session in the studios of WCVE-TV, channel 23. The chorus produced two ETV shows on barbershop harmony."

Track listing

Side one
 "Down Where the South Begins" – 3:00
 "He's Got the Whole World in His Hands" – 2:01
 "Climb Every Mountain" (Charlie Robertson, soloist) – 2:29
 "Nobody's Sweetheart Now" – 2:36
 "Scarlet Ribbons" – 3:25
 "God Bless America" – 1:30
 "My Melancholy Baby" – 3:04

Side two
 "Dixie Danny" – 3:04
 "Gee, but I Hate to Go Home Alone" – 2:53
 "Back in the Roaring Twenties" – 1:50
 "Shine On, Harvest Moon" – 1:49
 "Cabin on the Hill" – 2:15
 "South Rampart Street Parade" – 3:29
 "Keep America Singing" – 1:43

Down Where the South Begins was released in the summer of 1969. This album originally sold for $4.50.

References

1969 debut albums
Self-released albums
Tobaccoland Chorus albums